Calliostoma shinagawaense is a species of sea snail, a marine gastropod mollusk in the family Calliostomatidae.

Some authors place this taxon in the subgenus Calliostoma (Tristichotrochus).

Subspecies
 Calliostoma shinagawense cipangoanum Yokoyama, 1920
 Calliostoma shinagawense shinagawense (Tokunaga, 1906)

Description
The height of the shell varies between 12 mm and 40 mm. The sides of the shell are flat, giving it a triangular profile. The whorls are heavily sculptured with strongly beaded spiral cords along the periphery and the subsutural region with weakly beaded spiral cords in between.  The umbilicus is closed.  The aperture (opening) is nacreous (pearly).  The base is almost flat and is sculpted with numerous minutely granulated spiral cords.  The color is yellowish brown with reddish brown maculations.

Distribution
This species occurs from Kyushu to Honshu, Japan across to the Bōsō Peninsula on sand and gravel bottoms at depths of 5 to 50 m. It also occurs in the East China Sea and off Taiwan.

References

 Sasaki T. (2017). Family Calliostomatidae. Pp. 756-759, in: T. Okutani (ed.), Marine Mollusks in Japan, ed. 2. 2 vols. Tokai University Press. 1375 pp.

External links
 
 Tokunaga, S. (1906). Fossils from the environs of Tôkyô. Journal of the College of Science, Tokyo Imperial University. 21(2): 1-96, 5 pls

shinagawaense
Gastropods described in 1906